Malaysia competed at the 2022 World Athletics Championships in Eugene, Oregon, from 15 to 24 July. Malaysia has entered 2 athletes

Results

Men 
Field event

Women 
Track event

References 

Nations at the 2022 World Athletics Championships
World Championships in Athletics
Malaysia at the World Championships in Athletics